The 1954 Florida State Seminoles football team represented Florida State University as an independent during the 1954 college football season. Led by second-year head coach Tom Nugent, the Seminoles compiled a record of 8–4. Florida State was invited to the Sun Bowl, where they lost to Texas Western.

Schedule

References

Florida State
Florida State Seminoles football seasons
Florida State Seminoles football